The 2012 United States presidential election in West Virginia took place on November 6, 2012, as part of the 2012 United States presidential election in which all 50 states plus the District of Columbia participated. West Virginia voters chose five electors to represent them in the Electoral College via a popular vote pitting incumbent Democratic President Barack Obama and his running mate, Vice President Joe Biden, against Republican challenger and former Massachusetts Governor Mitt Romney and his running mate, Congressman Paul Ryan.

Mitt Romney defeated Barack Obama in the state of West Virginia by a landslide 26.76-point margin. The Republican ticket took 62.30% of the vote to the Democratic ticket's 35.54%, sweeping every county in the state. Romney became the first presidential candidate from any party since West Virginia's admission to the Union in 1863 to sweep every single county in the state and the first since Richard Nixon in 1972 to carry over 60% of the state's votes. This represented a historic loss for the Democrats in West Virginia, which had been a Democratic stronghold from the New Deal up through the 1990s. Obama is the only president since statehood to win two terms without ever winning the state once.

With 62.14% of the popular vote, West Virginia would prove to be Romney's fifth strongest state in the 2012 election after Utah, Wyoming, Oklahoma and Idaho. As of 2020, this is the last time the Democratic nominee has received more than 30% of the vote in the Mountain State.

Primaries

Democratic
Barack Obama defeated Keith Judd, a convicted felon serving a federal prison sentence in Texarkana, TX, by a surprisingly narrow 59% to 41%.

Republican

The Republican primary took place on May 8, 2012.

Results

Results by county

General election

Results

Results by county

Counties that flipped from Democratic to Republican 
 Boone (largest city: Madison)
 Braxton (largest town: Sutton)
 Jefferson (largest city: Charles Town)
 Marion (largest city: Fairmont)
 McDowell (largest city: Welch)
 Monongalia (largest city: Morgantown)
 Webster (largest town: Webster Springs)

By congressional district
Romney won all three congressional districts, including one held by a Democrat.

See also 
Republican Party presidential debates, 2012
Republican Party presidential primaries, 2012
Results of the 2012 Republican Party presidential primaries
United States presidential election in Virginia, 2012
West Virginia Republican Party

References

External links
The Green Papers: for West Virginia
The Green Papers: Major state elections in chronological order

2012
United States President
West Virginia